"The Conqueror Worm" is an 1843 poem by Edgar Allan Poe.  It may also refer to:
Witchfinder General (film), 1968 film retitled The Conqueror Worm for its United States release
 The Conqueror Worm (comics), 2001 Hellboy mini-series
 The Conqueror Worms, 2006 novel by Brian Keene